Senarath Liyana Arachchi is a Sri Lankan astrologer, palmist, author, guest and commentator on radio and television.

Career
Arachchi was a senior railway station master in Sri Lanka. He worked in different areas of the country as a railway station master for nearly 40 years.

Awards

References

External links
 Website
 YouTube
Newspaper Articles

Living people
Sinhalese writers
1950 births
Sri Lankan Buddhists
Sri Lankan astrologers
20th-century astrologers
21st-century astrologers
Palmists